Kevin Pina may refer to:

 Kevin Pina (journalist) (fl. 1985–present), American journalist
 Kevin Pina (footballer) (born 1997), Cape Verdean footballer